During the parade of nations portion of the 1984 Summer Olympics opening ceremony, athletes from each country participating in the Olympics paraded in the arena, preceded by their flag. The flag was borne by a sportsperson from that country chosen either by the National Olympic Committee or by the athletes themselves to represent their country.

Parade order
As the nation of the first modern Olympic Games, Greece entered the stadium first; whereas, the host nation of the United States marched last. Other countries entered in alphabetical order in the language of the host country (English), according with tradition and IOC guidelines.

Whilst most countries entered under their short names, a few entered under more formal or alternative names, mostly due to political and naming disputes. The Republic of China (commonly known as Taiwan) entered with the compromised name and flag of "Chinese Taipei" under T so that they did not enter together with conflicting People's Republic of China (commonly known as China), which entered as the "People's Republic of China" under C.

A record of 140 nations entered the stadium with a combined total of 7,078 athletes. Eighteen nations made their Olympic debut, namely Bahrain, Bangladesh, Bhutan, British Virgin Islands, Djibouti, Equatorial Guinea, Gambia, Grenada, Mauritania, Mauritius, North Yemen, Oman, Qatar, Rwanda, Samoa, Solomon Islands, Tonga, and the United Arab Emirates. The People's Republic of China made its first appearance at the Summer Olympics since 1952, while the Republic of China participated for the first time under the name Chinese Taipei as a result of the IOC agreement. Thirteen countries, namely Afghanistan, Angola, Bulgaria, Cuba, Czechoslovakia, Ethiopia, German Democratic Republic, Hungary, Laos, Mongolia, Democratic People's Republic of Korea, Poland, and Vietnam, were part of the Soviet Union boycott of these Games. Apart from the People's Republic of China (a communist country that had warmer relations with the United States than with the Soviet Union, following the Sino–Soviet split), Romania and Yugoslavia were among the socialist countries to disregard the boycott and attend the Games. Albania, Iran and Libya also did not compete at the Games, citing political reasons.

Notable flag bearers in the opening ceremony featured the following athletes: six-time Olympian and Star sailor Hubert Raudaschl (Austria); defending Olympic champions Stelios Mygiakis (Greece) in Greco-Roman wrestling, Esko Rechardt in Finn sailing, Angelo Parisi (France) in heavyweight judo, Sara Simeoni (Italy) in women's high jump, Corneliu Ion (Romania) in rapid fire pistol shooting, and Alejandro Abascal (Spain) in the Flying Dutchman; middle-distance runner and 1976 Olympic champion John Walker; dressage rider Christine Stückelberger (Switzerland); professional basketball player Dražen Dalipagić (Yugoslavia), who led his men's team to capture the gold medal in Moscow four years earlier; and hammer thrower Ed Burke (United States), who competed in his third appearance since the 1968 Summer Olympics in Mexico City.

List
The following is a list of each country's announced flag bearer. The list is sorted by the order in which each nation appears in the parade of nations. The names are given in their official designations by the IOC.

References

See also
 1980 Summer Olympics national flag bearers
 1988 Summer Olympics national flag bearers

Flag bearers
Lists of Olympic flag bearers
Los Angeles sports-related lists